Grips, Grunts and Groans is a 1937 short subject directed by Preston Black starring American slapstick comedy team The Three Stooges (Moe Howard, Larry Fine and Curly Howard). It is the 20th entry in the series released by Columbia Pictures starring the comedians, who appeared in 190 shorts for the studio between 1934 and 1959.

Plot
After escaping from the railroad police after stowing away on a train, the Stooges befriend a champion wrestler named Ivan Bustoff (Harrison Greene). His trainers, who are part of the mob, have a large bet placed on Bustoff to win the big match. But Bustoff likes to go out drinking, and after a wild night out with the boys, Bustoff downs a mixture made of "a little tequila, vodka and cognac", which he believes is not alcohol and a different kind of drink, then passes out from drinking the mixture. The mobsters hire/force the Stooges to become Bustoff's managers and get him to the ring sober. In the locker room at the arena, the boys are trying to wake Bustoff up, but Curly ended up knocking him out with dumb bells by accident and causing the locker to fall on him. Bustoff remains unconscious.

In fear, the Stooges substitute Curly, who possesses a tendency to get violent in reaction to the smell of Wild Hyacinth perfume. Moe and Larry realize that this can be used to their advantage. But the subsequent wrestling match is not a good time for Curly as he performs poorly. Moe then spots a woman spectator holding a bottle of Wild Hyacinth and gets it from her. By this time, the mobsters get wind of Bustoff's non-participation and are threatening the Stooges with harm if Curly does not win as planned. The Wild Hyacinth is then applied to Curly, and soon the challenger is knocked out cold along with nearly everyone else in attendance as Curly goes on a rampage using the match bell as a cudgel. The bell then slips out of Curly's hands and flies up in the air, only to land back onto his head and knock him out as well.

Cast

Production notes
The filming of Grips, Grunts and Groans took place from October 30 to November 5, 1936. Its title parodies the expression "gripes, grunts and groans."

An external stimulus that causes Curly to go berserk was also used as a plot element in Punch Drunks, Horses' Collars, and Tassels in the Air.

A production still shows that Solomon Horwitz — father to Moe, Curly and Shemp Howard —  appeared as a spectator during the wrestling scenes.

References

External links
 
 
Grips, Grunts and Groans at threestooges.net

1937 films
1937 comedy films
Columbia Pictures short films
American black-and-white films
Fiction about rail transport
The Three Stooges films
American slapstick comedy films
1930s English-language films
1930s American films